Eucinetus haemorrhoidalis is a species of plate-thigh beetle in the family Eucinetidae; it is holarctic in distribution, including the North American populations formerly known as Eucinetus terminalis.

References

Further reading

External links

 

Scirtoidea
Articles created by Qbugbot
Beetles described in 1818